Untranslatability is the property of text or speech for which no equivalent can be found when translated into another language. A text that is considered to be untranslatable is considered a lacuna, or lexical gap. The term arises when describing the difficulty of achieving the so-called perfect translation. It is based on the notion that there are certain concepts and words that are so interrelated that an accurate translation becomes an impossible task. Some writers have suggested that language carries sacred notions or is intrinsic to national identity. Brian James Baer posits that untranslatability is sometimes seen by nations as proof of the national genius. He quotes Alexandra Jaffe: "When translators talk about untranslatable, they often reinforce the notion that each language has its own 'genius', an 'essence' that naturally sets it apart from all other languages and reflects something of the 'soul' of its culture or people".

A translator, however, can resort to various translation procedures to compensate for a lexical gap. From this perspective, untranslatability does not carry deep linguistic relativity implications. Meaning can virtually always be translated, if not always with technical accuracy.

Theories 
There is a school of thought identified with Walter Benjamin that identifies the concept of "sacred" in relation to translation and this pertains to the text that is untranslatable because its meaning and letter cannot be disassociated. It stems from the view that translation should realize the imagined perfect relationship with the original text. This theory highlights the paradoxical nature of translation wherein it—as a process—assumes the forms of necessity and impossibility at the same time. This is demonstrated in Jacques Derrida's analysis of the myth of Babel, a word which he described as a name that means confusion and also a proper name of God. Furthermore, Derrida noted that when God condemned the world to a multiplicity of tongues, he created a paradoxical need and impossibility of translation.

Derrida himself has put forward his own notion of the untranslatability of the text, arguing in his early works such as the Writing and Difference and Margins of Philosophy that there is an excess of untranslatable meaning in literature, and it cannot be reduced to a closed system or a restricted economy "in which there is nothing that cannot be made to make sense."

Brian James Baer posits that untranslatability is sometimes seen by nations as proof of their national genius. Literature that can be easily translated may be considered as lacking originality, while translated works themselves may be regarded merely as imitations. Baer quotes Jean-Jacques Rousseau defining true genius as "the kind that creates and makes everything out of nothing". Paraphrasing Robert Frost's remark about poetry ("Poetry is what gets lost in translation"), Baer suggests that "one could define national identity as that which is lost in translation". He further quotes Alexandra Jaffe: "When translators talk about untranslatable, they often reinforce the notion that each language has its own 'genius', an 'essence' that naturally sets it apart from all other languages and reflects something of the 'soul' of its culture or people".

Quite often, a text or utterance that is considered to be "untranslatable" is considered a lacuna, or lexical gap. That is, there is no one-to-one equivalence between the word, expression or turn of phrase in the source language and another word, expression or turn of phrase in the target language. A translator can, however, resort to a number of translation procedures to compensate for this. From this perspective, untranslatability or difficulty of translation does not always carry deep linguistic relativity implications; denotation can virtually always be translated, given enough circumlocution, although connotation may be ineffable or inefficient to convey.

Examples

Register
Although Thai has words that can be used as equivalent to English "I", "you", or "he/she/it", they are relatively formal terms (or markedly informal). In most cases, Thai people use words which express the relation between speaker and listener according to their respective roles. For instance, for a mother to say to her child "I'll tell you a story", she would say "", or "Mother will tell child a story". Similarly, older and younger friends will often use sibling terminology, so that an older friend telling a younger friend "You're my friend" would be "", would translate directly as "Younger sibling is older sibling’s friend". To be translated into English correctly, it is proper to use "I" and "you" for these example statements, but normal Thai perceptions of relation are lost in the process.

Similar phenomena can also be observed in Indonesian. One may use the formal form of pronouns, which are generally distinct from the informal/familiar forms; however, the use of these pronouns does not evoke sufficient friendliness or intimacy, especially in spoken language. Instead of saying "", a waiter/waitress will most likely say "" (lit. 'Sir/Madam wants to order what?'). Both expressions are equally polite; however, the latter is more sympathetic and friendly. When conversing with family and relatives, most Indonesians also prefer using kinship terminology (father, mother, brother, sister) when addressing older family members. When addressing younger family members, informal pronouns are more prevalent.

Verb forms
English lacks some grammatical categories.

Irish allows the prohibitive mood to be used in the passive voice. The effect is used to prohibit something while expressing society's disapproval for that action at the same time.

The first indicates a concluded action in the (remote) past, the second a progressive or habitual action in the past, and the latter an action that holds some connection to the present, especially if a recent time is specified ("" for 'this morning I saw'). The  is often used for narrative history (for example, novels). What difference there exists is partly geographic. The distinction is only alive in Tuscany, which makes it dialectal even if hardline purists insist it should be applied consistently.

Likewise, English lacks a productive grammatical means to show indirection but must instead rely on periphrasis, that is the use of multiple words to explain an idea. Finnish grammar, on the contrary, allows the regular production of a series of verbal derivatives, each of which involves a greater degree of indirection. For example, on the basis of the verb  ('to pull'), it is possible to produce:
 (pull),
 (cause something/someone to pull/to wind-up (lie)),
 (cause something/someone to cause something/someone to pull),
 (cause something/someone to cause something/someone to cause something/someone to pull).

Hindi has a similar concept of indirection.  means 'to do';  means 'to make someone do';  means 'to get someone to make yet another person do'.

This grammatical form is especially used when telling jokes, or narrating stories.

Similar to the Turkic miş, nearly every Quechua sentence is marked by an evidential clitic, indicating the source of the speaker's knowledge (and how certain they are about the statement). The enclitic =mi expresses personal knowledge (Tayta Wayllaqawaqa chufirmi, "Mr. Huayllacahua is a driver - I know it for a fact"); =si expresses hearsay knowledge (Tayta Wayllaqawaqa chufirsi, "Mr. Huayllacahua is a driver, or so I've heard"); =chá expresses high probability (Tayta Wayllaqawaqa chufirchá, "Mr. Huayllacahua is a driver, most likely"). Colloquially, the latter is also used when the speaker has dreamed the event told in the sentence or experienced it while intoxicated.

Languages that are extremely different from each other, like English and Chinese, need their translations to be more like adaptations. Chinese has no tenses per se, only three aspects. The English verb "to be" does not have a direct equivalent in Chinese. In an English sentence where "to be" leads to an adjective ("It is blue"), there is no "to be" in Chinese. (There are no adjectives in Chinese, instead there are stative verbs that do not need an extra verb.) If it states a location, the verb  is used, as in "We are in the house". In some other cases (usually when stating a judgement), the judgment verb  is used, as in "I am the leader." And in most other cases, such structure ("to be") is simply not used, but some more natural structure in Chinese is used instead. Any sentence that requires a play on those different meanings will not work the same way in Chinese. In fact, very simple concepts in English can sometimes be difficult to translate, for example, there is no single direct translation for the word "yes" in Chinese, as in Chinese the affirmative is said by repeating the verb in the question. ("Do you have it?" "(I) have".)

Vocabulary
German, Dutch and Danish have a wealth of modal particles that are particularly difficult to translate as they convey sense or tone rather than strictly grammatical information. What makes translating such words difficult is their different meanings depending on intonation or the context.

A common use of the word  can be found in the German sentence , which translates to The war wasn't lost yet, after all or The war was still not lost.

Several other grammatical constructs in English may be employed to translate these words for each of their occurrences. The same  with slightly changed pronunciation can also mean excuse in defense to a question: . . . but the war was not lost yet (. . . so we fought on).

A use which relies heavily on intonation and context could produce yet another meaning: "So the war was really not over yet (as you have been trying to convince me all along)."

Another change of intonation makes the sentence a question.  would translate into "(You mean) the war was not yet lost (back then)?"

Similar difficulties occur with the Dutch words "even", "toch", and, especially, "gezellig".

However,  is used only with essence or nature, while  is used with states or conditions. Sometimes this information is not very relevant for the meaning of the whole sentence and the translator will ignore it, whereas at other times it can be retrieved from the context.

When none of these apply, the translator will usually use a paraphrase or simply add words that can convey that meaning. The following example comes from Portuguese:
""
Spanish equivalent:""
Literal translation: "I am not (apparently/just right now) handsome; I am (essentially/always) handsome."
Adding words: "I am not handsome today; I am always handsome."
Paraphrase: "I don't look handsome; I am handsome."

Some South Slavic words that have no English counterparts are doček, a gathering organized at someone's arrival (the closest translation would be greeting or welcome; however, a 'doček' does not necessarily have to be positive); and limar, a sheet metal worker.

Family

Kinship terminology often varies across languages. Terms are often too specific or too general to translate into another language. Some rules used for defining kinship terminology include the following:

Paternal or maternal. For example, Nordic languages, Indo-Aryan languages and Chinese languages distinguish paternal and maternal relatives such as paternal grandmother and maternal grandmother. Conversely, son's son and daughter's son are also distinguished. Similarly, aunts and uncles are further divided in many languages.

Gender. Whereas English kinship terms make clear distinction between genders, many languages do not. For example, Thai does not distinguish between siblings by gender, but only by age. Thai also disregards gender when aunts or uncles are younger than their parents. Thai also has one word for all nieces, nephews, and grandchildren. On the flip side, the English word cousins does not distinguish gender, but many languages do, included Romance languages, Slavic languages and Chinese languages.

By blood or by marriage. For example, the English word uncle can refer to a parent's brother, or a husband of a parent's sibling. Many languages, such as Hindi, Bengali, Hungarian and Chinese distinguish these. This is also true for Latin where e.g.  refers to one's mother's brother, but cannot refer to one's mother's sister's husband, named thus  (the husband of the maternal aunt).

Full or half sibling. In Arabic, "brother" is often translated into . However, whilst this word may describe a brother who shares either one or both parents, there is a separate word -  - to describe a brother with whom one shares both parents.

Age relative to oneself or one's parent. For example in Bengali, father's elder brothers are called , while younger brothers are called . Another common issue is translating brother or sister into Chinese or Japanese, which have separate words for older and younger ones.

Relations by marriage. There is no standard English word for the Italian "", Yiddish "",, Latin , Spanish "" or Portuguese "": a gender-neutral collective plural like "co-in-laws". If Harry marries Sally, then in Yiddish, Harry's father is the "" of Sally's father; each mother is the "" of the other. In Romanian, they are “”.

Spanish and Portuguese contrast "brother" with "brother-in-law" ("/", "/"); "son" with "son-in-law" ("/", "/"), and similarly for female relatives like "sister-in-law" ("/") and "daughter-in-law" ("/"). Both languages use "" (Sp.) or "/" (varying by dialect), as the relationship between two men that marry siblings (or two women, using the feminine "/" instead). In the English language this relationship would be lumped in with "/" (sibling's husband or spouse's brother) as simply "brother-in-law".

Serbian and Bosnian have specific terms for relations by marriage. For example, a "sister-in-law" can be a "snaha/snaja" (brother's wife, though also family-member's wife in general), "zaova" (husband's sister), "svastika" (wife's sister) or "jetrva" (husband's brother's wife). A "brother-in-law" can be a "zet" (sister's husband, or family-member's husband in general), "djever/dever" (husband's brother), "šurak/šurjak" (wife's brother) or "badžanak/pašenog" (wife's sister's husband). Likewise, the term "prijatelj" (same as "makhatunim" in Yiddish, which also translates as "friend") is also used. Bengali has a number of in-law words. For example, Boudi (elder brother's wife), Shaali (wife's sister), Shaala (wife's younger brother), Sambandhi (wife's elder brother/Shaali's husband), Bhaasur (husband's elder brother), Deor (husband's younger brother) Nanad (husband's sister), Jaa (husband's brother's wife), etc.

In Russian, fifteen different words cover relations by marriage, enough to confuse many native speakers . There are for example, as in Yiddish, words like "" and "" for "co-in-laws". To further complicate the translator's job, Russian in-laws may choose to address each other familiarly by these titles.

In contrast to all of the above fine distinctions, in American English the term "my brother-in-law" covers "my spouse's brother", "my sibling's husband", and "my spouse's sibling's husband". In British English, the last of these is not considered strictly correct.

Work and school relations

Japanese has a concept, amae, about the closeness of parent-child relationship, that is supposedly unique to that language and culture as it applies to bosses and workers.

Japanese, Chinese, and Korean have words for classmates and colleagues of different seniority and/or gender. The most well-known example to English speakers is probably the Japanese word , referring to a senior classmate or colleague.

Foreign objects
Objects unknown to a culture can actually be easy to translate. For example, in Japanese, wasabi  is a plant (Wasabia japonica) used as a spicy Japanese condiment. Traditionally, this plant only grows in Japan. It would be unlikely that someone from a country such as Angola would have a clear understanding of it. However, the easiest way to translate this word is to borrow it. Or one can use a similar vegetable's name to describe it. In English this word is translated as wasabi or Japanese horseradish. In Chinese, people can still call it wasabi by its Japanese sound, or pronounce it by its Hanzi characters,  (pinyin: shān kuí). One may specify yellow mustard and green mustard to avoid confusion.

Another method is using description instead of a single word. For example, languages like Russian and Ukrainian have borrowed words Kuraga and Uruk from Turkic languages. While both fruits are now known to the Western world, there are still no terms for them in English. English speakers have to use "dried apricot without core" and "dried apricot with core" instead.

One particular type of foreign object that poses difficulties is the proper noun. As an illustration, consider another example from Douglas Hofstadter, which he published in one of his "Metamagical Themas" columns in Scientific American. He pondered the question: "Who is the first lady of Britain? Well, first ladies reside at the prime minister's address, and at the time, the woman living at 10 Downing Street was Margaret Thatcher. But a different attribute that first ladies have is that they are married to heads of government, so perhaps a better answer was Denis Thatcher, but he probably would not have relished the title."

Poetry, puns and wordplay
The two areas which most nearly approach total untranslatability are poetry and puns; poetry is difficult to translate because of its reliance on the sounds (for example, rhymes) and rhythms of the source language; puns, and other similar semantic wordplay, because of how tightly they are tied to the original language. The oldest well-known examples are probably those appearing in Bible translations, for example, Genesis 2:7, which explains why God gave Adam this name: "God created Adam out of soil from the ground"; the original Hebrew text reveals the secret, since the word Adam connotes the word ground (being  in Hebrew), whereas translating the verse into other languages makes it lose the original pun.

Similarly, consider the Italian adage "": a literal translation is "translator, traitor". The pun is lost, though the meaning persists. (A similar solution can be given, however, in Hungarian, by saying , which roughly translates as "translation is distortion".)

That being said, many of the translation procedures discussed here can be used in these cases. For example, the translator can compensate for an "untranslatable" pun in one part of a text by adding a new pun in another part of the translated text.

Oscar Wilde's play The Importance of Being Earnest incorporates in its title a pun (resonating in the last line of the play) that conflates the name Ernest with the adjective of quality earnest. The French title of the translated play is "", replicating and transposing the pun; however, the character Ernest had to be renamed, and the allusion to trickery was lost. (Other French translations include "" (faithful) and "" (loved), with the same idea of a pun on first name / quality adjective.) A recent Hungarian translation of the same play by Ádám Nádasdy applied a similar solution, giving the subtitle "" (lit. "One must be Szilárd") beside the traditional title "Bunbury", where "" is a male name as well as an adjective meaning "solid, firm", or "steady". Other languages, like Spanish, usually leave the pun untranslated, as in "", while one translation used the name Severo, which means "severe" or "serious", close to the original English meaning. Catalan translations always use "". This example uses the homophones "Frank" (given name) and "" (honest, free-spoken). Although this same solution would work in Spanish also (""), it carries heavy political connotations in Spain due to Francisco Franco's dictatorship (1939–1975), to a point that even this possible title can be taken directly as ironic/sarcastic: literally, "The importance of being Franco", so this alternative was never used. However, the German translation "" (literally "Being Ernst is everything") only changes the name very slightly, in fact - unlike the equivalents in English - the adjective  is even spelt exactly as the name Ernst and, given the position at the beginning of the title, both meanings would be capitalised.

The Asterix comic strip is renowned for its French puns; its translators have found many ingenious English substitutes.

Other forms of wordplay, such as spoonerisms and palindromes are equally difficult, and often force hard choices on the translator. For example, take the classic palindrome: "A man, a plan, a canal: Panama". A translator might choose to translate it literally into, say, French – "", if it were used as a caption for a photo of Theodore Roosevelt (the chief instigator of the Canal), and sacrifice the palindrome. But if the text is meant to give an example of a palindrome, they might elect to sacrifice the literal sense and substitute a French palindrome, such as "" ('A boulder swept away the horned animal').

Douglas Hofstadter discusses the problem of translating a palindrome into Chinese, where such wordplay is theoretically impossible, in his book  – which is devoted to the issues and problems of translation, with particular emphasis on the translation of poetry. Another example given by Hofstadter is the translation of the poem Jabberwocky by Lewis Carroll, with its wealth of neologisms and portmanteau words, into a number of foreign tongues.

A notable Irish joke is that it is not possible to translate mañana into Irish as the Irish "don't have a word that conveys that degree of urgency".

Iconicity
According to Ghil'ad Zuckermann, "Iconicity might be the reason for refraining from translating Hallelujah and Amen in so many languages, as if the sounds of such basic religious notions have to do with their referents themselves – as if by losing the sound, one might lose the meaning. Compare this to the Kabbalistic power of letters, for example in the case of gematria, the method of interpreting the Hebrew Scriptures by interchanging words whose letters have the same numerical value when added. A simple example of gematric power might be the famous proverb , or lit. "entered wine went out secret", i.e. "wine brings out the truth", in vino veritas. Thus, this sentence, according to many Jews at the time, had to be true."

See also

 Adam Jacot de Boinod
 Metaphor
 Terminology
 Terms with no direct English translation
 Texas sharpshooter fallacy#Translation and interpretation
 Translation
 Indeterminacy of translation

References

Further reading

External links

 BBC News: Congo word "most untranslatable"
 Untranslatable Words from Treasure Languages

Translation studies
Semantics